Fareedabad (فريدآباد) is a village located in the Khairpur District in the Sindh province of Pakistan.

Populated places in Khairpur District